Olivier Norek is a French writer of crime fiction.

Biography 
He was born in Toulouse in 1975. He served as an aid worker in Guyana and the former Yugoslavia. He became a policeman, serving for 18 years and eventually rising to the rank of captain in the Seine-Saint-Denis district.

His crime novels have been bestsellers in France, and the first of his Banlieue trilogy, titled Code 93, has been translated into English by Nick Caistor and published by Maclehose Press under the title The Lost and the Damned. The series features the fictional police detective Captain Coste.

References

French writers
1975 births
Living people